Mama: Dispatches from the Frontline of Love is Antonella Gambotto-Burke's first book about parenthood and sixth work. The foreword was written by French obstetrician and academic Michel Odent. Dealing with the issue of attachment on levels ranging from the cultural to maternal-infant, Mama: Dispatches from the Frontline of Love features essays about Gambotto-Burke's experiences of motherhood and long-form interviews. Her interviewees include historian Stephanie Coontz, artist Michael Hague, anthropologist Sheila Kitzinger, psychologist Gabor Maté, Michel Odent, and others. Mama was launched by internationally bestselling parenting author and psychology professor Steve Biddulph, who described the book's insights as "really important". In an interview with the ABC, founder of the Read Clinic and widely published psychologist Dr. John Irvine described Mama: Dispatches from the Frontline of Love as being to motherhood what The Female Eunuch was to feminism.

Kelly Higgins-Devine of the ABC joined the chorus of praise for the book, and in The Weekend Australian, reviewer Jack Marx described Mama as "anything but a book about a baby", and described it as "personal, magical, sublimely powerful, and medical jargon can take a hike. Gambotto-Burke’s point is that the shared experiences of mothers are of a value no PhD can match." He continued: "To suggest a patriarchal plot is not to be a fringe conspiracy theorist. In his 2012 book Sex and Punishment, Eric Berkowitz argued convincingly that ancient lawmakers, spooked by what they saw as the possibility of blokes becoming biologically redundant, had created a society that would condemn motherhood to little more than a masculine factory in which women laboured. This society exists today, motherhood still regarded as a temporary vocation for which one must seek 'leave', presumably from something more important than the raising of emotionally nourished human beings. Together, the voices in Mama push this same barrow, and it makes for an arresting argument."

In an interview, Gambotto-Burke noted, "The kinds of pressures we exert [on children] are very different [to the Tiger Mother Syndrome] – expecting children to flourish without attention, punishing children for not complying, exposing children to all manner of unsuitable material and then bewailing their behavioural problems ... The greatest disservice parents do themselves and their children is living life at a crazy pace. We all need to slow down. We need to turn off our radios and televisions and PCs and just learn to be with our children. We need to listen to and take pleasure in them. Childhood is a garden, not a series of developmental stages."

World English rights (excluding Australia/New Zealand) were picked up by Pinter and Martin in London. Mama will be published internationally in 2015.

References

External links 
 http://arbonpublishing.com/product/mamabook/
 https://www.youtube.com/watch?v=KtYSuikS9Xo
 https://archive.today/20140428132911/http://tenplay.com.au/channel-ten/wake-up/extra/season-2014/24-april-smotherly-love

2014 non-fiction books